Sofia Rotaru and Chervona Ruta is a 1981 studio album by Sofia Rotaru, recorded at Melodiya in the USSR. It is packaged together with Where Has Love Gone?, the film soundtrack for Where Has Love Gone?.

Track listing

Languages of performance 

Songs are performed in Russian, Ukrainian (1, 8) and Moldavian (4, 5, 7, 9) languages.

References

External links 
artvertep
Volodymyr Ivasyuk Official Fan-Club Site

1981 albums
Sofia Rotaru albums